Infomax is an optimization principle for artificial neural networks and other information processing systems.  It prescribes that a function that maps a set of input values I to a set of output values O should be chosen or learned so as to maximize the average Shannon mutual information between I and O, subject to a set of specified constraints and/or noise processes.  Infomax algorithms are learning algorithms that perform this optimization process. The principle was described by Linsker in 1988.

Infomax, in its zero-noise limit, is related to the principle of redundancy reduction proposed for biological sensory processing by Horace Barlow in 1961, and applied quantitatively to retinal processing by Atick and Redlich.

One of the applications of infomax has been to an independent component analysis algorithm that finds independent signals by maximizing entropy.  Infomax-based ICA was described by Bell and Sejnowski, and Nadal and Parga in 1995.

See also
 FastICA

References

 
 
 

Artificial neural networks
Computational neuroscience